Senator O'Connor may refer to:

Edmund O'Connor (1848–1898), New York State Senate
Edward T. O'Connor Jr. (born 1942), New Jersey State Senate
Frank D. O'Connor (1909–1992), New York State Senate
Frank Patrick O'Connor (1885–1939), State Senate of Canada
Senator O'Connor College School, named for Frank Patrick O'Connor
Michael J. O'Connor (politician) (1928–2018), South Dakota State Senate
Patrick O'Connor (Massachusetts politician) (born 1984), Massachusetts State Senate
Sandra Day O'Connor (born 1930), Arizona State Senate

See also
Herbert O'Conor (1896–1960), U.S. Senator from Maryland from 1947 to 1953